Terri Dendy (born May 8, 1965) is a former American track and field athlete from Wilmington, Delaware. Dendy was ranked among the top ten women in the U.S. for the 400 meters event from 1986 through 1989 and again in 1993.  She was an alternate on the U.S. 4 x 400 meters relay team at the 1988 Summer Olympics.

Dendy graduated from Concord High School, where she set a state record in the 400 meters. She continued her career at George Mason University, where she set school records indoors at 300 meters (38.77), 400 meters (52.57), 500 meters (1:11.45) and outdoors 400 meters (51.45). Dendy was a semi-finalist in the 200 meters event at the 1989 World Indoor Championships, running 23.75 seconds.

In 1993, at the World Indoor Championships in Toronto, Dendy won a silver medal in the 4 × 400 m relay. Outdoors, she also won a silver medal at the World Championships in Stuttgart, where she ran in the heats of the 4 × 400 m relay but not the final.

Her sister Dionne Jones-Dendy was also a track and field athlete, and her nephew Marquis Dendy is an American champion in the long jump. She now works as the Athletic Director at Northwestern High School in Hyattsville, Maryland.

References

External links

1965 births
Living people
Sportspeople from Wilmington, Delaware
American female sprinters
World Athletics Championships athletes for the United States
World Athletics Championships medalists
Pan American Games track and field athletes for the United States
Pan American Games silver medalists for the United States
Pan American Games medalists in athletics (track and field)
Athletes (track and field) at the 1995 Pan American Games
George Mason Patriots women's track and field athletes
Universiade medalists in athletics (track and field)
Universiade gold medalists for the United States
World Athletics Indoor Championships medalists
World Athletics Championships winners
Medalists at the 1989 Summer Universiade
Medalists at the 1995 Pan American Games
20th-century American women
21st-century American women